Sweetenings is an album by trumpeter Harry "Sweets" Edison featuring tracks recorded in 1958 which was originally released on the Roulette label.

Reception

AllMusic awarded the album 3 stars and its review by Ken Dryden states, "Harry "Sweets" Edison added something special to any date in which he took part, but these 1958 sessions he led for Roulette are especially enjoyable".

Track listing
All compositions by Harry "Sweets" Edison except as indicated
 "Centerpiece" - 3:25
 "Candy" (Alex Kramer, Mack David, Joan Whitney) - 2:30
 "Jive at Five" (Count Basie, Edison) - 2:48
 "Imagination" (Jimmy Van Heusen, Johnny Burke) - 2:33
 "Louisiana" (J. C. Johnson, Andy Razaf) - 2:27
 "Harriet" - 3:10
 "It Happened in Monterey" (Billy Rose, Mabel Wayne) - 2:02
 "If I Had You" (Jimmy Campbell, Reg Connelly, Ted Shapiro) - 3:14
 "Paradise" (Nacio Herb Brown, Gordon Clifford) - 2:20
 "(Back Home Again in) Indiana" (Ballard MacDonald, James F. Hanley) - 1:46 		
 "Pussy Willow" - 3:58
 "Sweetenings" - 2:33

Personnel 
Harry "Sweets" Edison - trumpet
Jimmy Forrest - tenor saxophone
Kenny Drew Jimmy Jones - piano
Joe Benjamin, John Simmons - bass
Charlie Persip - drums

References 

1958 albums
Albums produced by Teddy Reig
Harry Edison albums
Roulette Records albums